Eric Vivian Tullett, known as Tom Tullett (1915 – December 1991) was a renowned British Crime Journalist. He adopted the name Tom when he joined a busy National News Desk as a Crime Reporter.  He was a big man in every sense of the word, and was a much loved and respected figure in Fleet Street.  One of the last investigative journalists of his day, he died in 1991.

Biography

He was formerly the Chief of the Daily Mirror's Crime Bureau and was one of the best known crime reporters in Fleet Street. Prior to this he was a member of the British Criminal Investigation Department at Scotland Yard and investigated many major crimes in the UK. He therefore developed an intimate knowledge of London's underworld.

Bibliography

 Portrait of a Bad Man. (The Life and Death of Ronald Chesney, an International Smuggler and Murderer) 
 Murder Squad: Famous Cases of Scotland Yard's Murder Squad from Crippen to The Black Panther
 Inside Interpol
 Inside Dartmoor
 Bernard Spilsbury: His Life and Cases (Pathologist) - co-author with Douglas G Browne
 No answer from Foxtrot Eleven (Murder of Police Officers).
 Strictly Murder
 Clues to Murder: Famous Forensic Murder Cases of Professor J M Cameron

References

1915 births
1991 deaths
British male journalists